Prasanna Sampath Amarasekara (born March 21, 1981) is a Sri Lankan track and field sprinter. He participated at the 2002, 2006, and 2010 Commonwealth Games the 2005 Asian Championships in Athletics and the 2005 World Championships in Athletics.

References

All-Athletics profile

1981 births
Living people
Sri Lankan male sprinters
Athletes (track and field) at the 2006 Commonwealth Games
Athletes (track and field) at the 2002 Commonwealth Games
Athletes (track and field) at the 2010 Commonwealth Games
Asian Games medalists in athletics (track and field)
Athletes (track and field) at the 2002 Asian Games
Athletes (track and field) at the 2006 Asian Games
Athletes (track and field) at the 2010 Asian Games
Place of birth missing (living people)
Asian Games bronze medalists for Sri Lanka
Medalists at the 2002 Asian Games
Medalists at the 2006 Asian Games
Commonwealth Games competitors for Sri Lanka